Ravalya Fort  (transliteration: Ravalya Qilа̄)is located 43 km from Nashik, Nashik district, of Maharashtra. The Ravlya fort and Javlya fort are twin forts located on a single hill plateau. Ravlya on the west and the Javlya on the east side of the hill plateau.

History
The fort was positioned to overlook the trade route from Khandesh to Nashik. The twin forts are also named as "Rola-Jola" forts. In 1636 this fort was won by Alavardikhan for the Mughal emperor Shah Jahan. In 1670 this fort was won by Shivaji Maharaj. In 1671 Dilerkhan encircled the fort with Moghul Army but, was defeated. However, MahabatKhan captured this fort. This fort was under the Peshwas for a long time until the British forces captured it in 1818. In 1819 Captain Mackintosh destroyed the steps, bastion and the walls of the fort making the ascent of the fort impracticable.

How to reach
There are regular buses from Nashik to Wani. The cole ahead of the base village Babapur can be reached easily by bus. It takes about 5 hours to see both the forts
Gaid- yashwant thakare-7350225565

Places to see
There is nothing structure left on the fort except few ruined buildings and few dried up water cisterns.

See also 
 List of forts in Maharashtra
 List of forts in India
 Marathi People
 List of Maratha dynasties and states
 Maratha War of Independence
 Military history of India
 List of people involved in the Maratha Empire
 Mughal Empire

References 

Buildings and structures of the Maratha Empire
Forts in Nashik district
16th-century forts in India
Tourist attractions in Nashik district
Former populated places in India